Arletta is a genus of butterflies in the family Lycaenidae and subgenus of Oreolyce.

Lycaenidae
Lycaenidae genera